Organza is a thin, plain weave, sheer fabric traditionally made from silk. Many modern organzas are woven with synthetic filament fibers such as polyester or nylon. Silk organza is woven by a number of mills along the Yangtze River and in the province of Zhejiang in China. A coarser silk organza is woven in the Bangalore area of India. Deluxe silk organzas are woven in France and Italy. Organza is distinguished by its crisp hand, stiffness relative to weight, and slippery surface texture. 

Organza is used for bridalwear and eveningwear. Sometimes, it is used as a hidden structural element. Beginning in the 1980's, trends shifted and organza began seeing more use in day to day clothing. In the interiors market, it is used for effects in bedrooms and between rooms. Double-width organzas in viscose and acetate are used as sheer curtains.

The term may derive from French organsin, ultimately from the Central Asian city of Urgench, the midpoint of the Northern Silk Road.

See also
 Organdy
 Tulle (netting), another sheer fabric
 Gauze

References

Net fabrics
Woven fabrics